Vaccinium pallidum is a species of flowering plant in the heath family known by the common names hillside blueberry, Blue Ridge blueberry, late lowbush blueberry, and early lowbush blueberry. It is native to central Canada (Ontario) and the central and eastern United States (from Maine west to Wisconsin and south as far as Georgia and Louisiana) plus the Ozarks of Missouri, Arkansas, southeastern Kansas and eastern Oklahoma.

Description 
Vaccinium pallidum is a deciduous shrub, erect in stature but variable in height. It is colonial, sprouting from its rhizome to form colonies of clones. The shrub has greenish brown to red bark on its stems, and the smaller twigs may be green, reddish, yellowish, or gray. The alternately arranged leaves are also variable. They are generally roughly oval and measure 2 to 6 centimeters (0.8–2.4 inches) long. They are green to yellowish or bluish in color, turning red in the fall. The flowers are cylindrical, bell-shaped, or urn-shaped and are borne in racemes of up to 11. They are white to pinkish or greenish in color, or "greenish white with pink striping", and about half a centimeter to one centimeter long. They are pollinated by bees such as bumblebees and Andrena carlini. The fruit is a berry up to 1.2 centimeters long. It is waxy blue to shiny black in color, or rarely pure white. It contains several seeds, a few of which are generally not viable. The plant reproduces sexually via seed and vegetatively by sprouting from the rhizome.

Distribution and habitat 
Vaccinium pallidum is native to central Canada (Ontario) and the central and eastern United States. It grows in many types of habitat, including oak and chestnut woodlands, maple-dominated swamps, pine barrens, pine savanna, and a variety of forest types. It grows in the understory of trees such as red oak, black oak, white oak, post oak, chestnut oak, blackjack oak, Virginia pine, shortleaf pine, pitch pine, loblolly pine, longleaf pine, jack pine, eastern hemlock, red maple, and black cherry.

Vaccinium pallidum is common on disturbed sites such as roadsides and abandoned fields. It also grows at climax in old-growth oak stands in the South Carolina piedmont. It can grow on dry, rocky soils, sandy and gravelly soils, and heavy clay. The climate is generally humid.

Uses 
The wild fruits are food for many types of bird and other animals. Each individual fruit has approximately eight calories. For humans the taste is "sweet to bland" and the fruit can be eaten fresh, in pies, or as jelly. The fruit is harvested and sold commercially in some areas, such as northeastern Alabama and northwestern Georgia. The plant is also grown as an ornamental.

References

External links

United States Department of Agriculture Plants Profile
The Nature Conservancy
photo of herbarium specimen at Missouri Botanical Garden, collected in Missouri in 1991

pallidum
Flora of the Northeastern United States
Blueberries
Plants described in 1789
Flora of the Southeastern United States
Flora of the North-Central United States
Flora of Ontario